Krog (Prekmurje Slovene: Kroug) is a village in the Municipality of Murska Sobota in the Prekmurje region of northeastern Slovenia.

There is a small chapel in the settlement. It was built in 1849 and is dedicated to Saint Florian.

References

External links
Krog on Geopedia

Populated places in the City Municipality of Murska Sobota